California Sunrise is a 2016 album by Jon Pardi.

California Sunrise may also refer to:

California Sunrise, 2016 song by Jon Pardi from album California Sunrise
California Sunrise, 2007 song by Trance duo Blank & Jones from the eighth studio album Relax Edition 3
California Sunrise, 2005 song by Bassnectar